William Henry Bailey (January 22, 1831 – 1908) was an American author, lawyer, and politician.

Born in Elizabeth City, Pasquotank County, North Carolina, Bailey attended the Bingham School and the University of North Carolina, and entered the practice of law in the state in 1852. He was elected and appointed to many offices in his native state, including serving as Attorney General of North Carolina in 1857. He moved to Texas in 1891. He was the author of The Effect of Civil War upon the Rights of Persons and Property and Conflict of Judicial Decisions, and other works.

Bailey died at his home in Houston, Texas, at the age of 77, and was interred in Glenwood Cemetery.

References

1831 births
1908 deaths
North Carolina Attorneys General
People from Pasquotank County, North Carolina
Members of the North Carolina House of Representatives
19th-century American politicians